Bars (Latin: comitatus Barsiensis, Hungarian: Bars, Slovak: Tekov, German: Barsch) was an administrative county (comitatus) of the Kingdom of Hungary. Its territory is now in central and southern Slovakia. Today in Slovakia, Tekov is the informal designation of the corresponding territory.

Geography

It was situated along the Garam river between Hont in the east, Körmöcbánya and Felsőbesenyő in the north (which were part of the county), the Zsitva river in the west, and Zsitvabesenyő and Bény in the south (which was not part of the county). The rivers Garam and Zsitva ran through the county. The county was characterised by mining.

Capitals
The capital of the county was the Bars Castle, then the Léva Castle, then from the late 16th century Kistapolcsány and since the 18th century Aranyosmarót.

History
The county arose in the 11th century. The southern part of this county was occupied by Ottoman Empire between 1663 and 1685 and managed as Uyvar Eyalet by her. In the aftermath of World War I, the area became part of newly formed Czechoslovakia, as recognized by the concerned states in 1920 by the Treaty of Trianon.

Following the provisions of the First Vienna Award, the southern part of the area was returned to Hungary in November 1938. This was merged with the southern part of the former Hont county to form Bars-Hont county, with the capital Léva.

After World War II, the Trianon borders were restored and the area lay again completely in Czechoslovakia. In 1993, Czechoslovakia was split and Tekov became part of Slovakia.

Demographics

Subdivisions

In the early 20th century, the subdivisions of Bars county were:

Notes

References

Counties in the Kingdom of Hungary
States and territories established in the 11th century